Dunglass Island is an uninhabited island in the River Conon south-west of the village of Conon Bridge in the  Highlands of Scotland.

The island, which contains the site of an Iron Age fort, can be reached by a wooden road bridge accessed by a track leading from the farm of Dunglass on the west side of the river or across a footbridge that spans a weir at the south-west extremity of the island.

Following a substantial flood in 1892, Nairne described the island as follows: 
The Conon channel used to be the larger of the two but a gravel bank was thrown across above the Islands, and the greatest part of the river, for a time flowed through the Dunglass channel. The diversion of the river caused enormous damage to salmon ova, as the breeding banks were left dry, and something like a million ova practically became useless.

In 2004, a £38,000 biodiversity project involving Scottish Natural Heritage, Conon District Salmon Fishery Board, Brahan Estates, the Highland Council and Ross and Cromarty Enterprise was undertaken. This work restored an alder-lined channel through the island, which had become "defunct".

Notes

Uninhabited islands of Highland (council area)
River islands of Scotland